Marco Shores-Hammock Bay is a census-designated place (CDP) in western Collier County, Florida, United States. It is bordered to the west by Florida State Road 951 (Collier Boulevard) and to the south by McIlvane Bay.

The location was first listed as a CDP prior to the 2020 census.

Demographics

References 

Census-designated places in Collier County, Florida
Census-designated places in Florida